Tuangku (also known as Great Banyak) is the main and largest island in the Banyak Islands group in Indonesia. The largest town on the island is Haloban.

As a consequence of the 2005 Nias–Simeulue earthquake, the island dropped rendering the coastal residences useless and damaging the port.

External links

Coastal Changes caused by 2005 Nias–Simeulue earthquake

Islands of Sumatra
Uninhabited islands of Indonesia